The Sukkites were an ancient African nation. It is mentioned in the Hebrew Bible as one of three that participated with King Shishaq (also spelled "Shishak," and associated by many scholars with Shoshenq I) of Egypt when he attacked Jerusalem. This is the only biblical reference to Sukkiim.

Chronicles 2, Chapter 12:

And it came to pass, when Rehoboam had established the kingdom, and had strengthened himself, he forsook the law of the Lord, and all Israel with him...And it came to pass, that in the fifth year of king Rehoboam Shishak king of Egypt came up against Jerusalem, because they had transgressed against the Lord. With twelve hundred chariots, and threescore thousand horsemen: and the people were without number that came with him out of Egypt; the Lubims, the Sukkiims, and the Ethiopians.

See also
History of Ethiopia
Hebrew Bible nations
History of Africa